Jean-Baptiste Geoffroy (born in the diocese of Clermont, 1601, and died in Paris, 30 Oct 1675) was a French composer. He entered the Jesuit order as a novice in 1621 and from 1660 until his death directed the music at the church attached to the Jesuit Professed house of Paris  (known today as the Saint-Paul-Saint-Louis church), where Marc-Antoine Charpentier later served.

Besides a few vocal works in manuscript, three publications are known: 
Musicalia varia ad usum ecclesiae (1650, lost)
Musica sacra ad vesperas aliasque in ecclesia preces for one, two and four voices with organ (1659)
Musica sacra ad varias ecclesiae preces … pars altera (1661), for four voices, including a Mass recently reedited by the Centre de Musique Baroque de Versailles

Sources 
Nathalie Berton-Blivet, Catalogue du motet imprimé en France (1647-1789). Paris: , 2011.
Laurent Guillo, Pierre I Ballard et Robert III Ballard, imprimeurs du roy pour la musique (Liège and Versailles : 2003).
, Les Jésuites et la musique. Liège: Mardaga, 1991.
Gaëtan Naulleau, La pratique de la basse continue en France au regard de la Musica Sacra de Jean-Baptiste Geoffroy, Ballard, 1659, 1661, Mémoire de maîtrise, Université de Paris IV-Sorbonne, 1997.
Henri Rybeyrete, Scriptores provinciæ franciæ Societatis Jesu ab anno 1640 ad annum 1670 collecti ab Henrico Rybeyrete ejusdem societatis, 1670. Manuscript. Vanves, Archives de la Compagnie de Jésus.
Carlos Sommervogel and Aloys De Backer, Bibliothèque de la Compagnie de Jésus. Bruxelles et Paris: 1890-1900 (9 vol.)

References

External links 

Digital scans from the Library of Toulouse

1601 births
1675 deaths
French Jesuits
French composers of sacred music
French Baroque composers
French male classical composers
17th-century classical composers
17th-century male musicians